Amy Summers (born May 3, 1963) is an American politician who has served in the West Virginia House of Delegates from the 49th district since 2014.

Early life and education
Summers was born on May 3, 1963, to parents Paul and Nel Elder. She graduated from West Virginia University with her Bachelor of Science degree and completed her Master's degree in Nursing, Leadership and Management from Western Governors University.

References

1963 births
21st-century American politicians
21st-century American women politicians
Living people
Republican Party members of the West Virginia House of Delegates
Western Governors University alumni
Women state legislators in West Virginia